Ivanska is a village and a municipality in Bjelovar-Bilogora County, Croatia. There are 2,911 inhabitants, of which 92% are Croats. The village of Ivanska itself has a population of 722.

History
In the late 19th and early 20th century, Ivanska was part of the Bjelovar-Križevci County of the Kingdom of Croatia-Slavonia.

References

External links

 

Municipalities of Croatia
Populated places in Bjelovar-Bilogora County